Eudonia is a large and widespread genus in the grass moth family (Crambidae), subfamily Scopariinae. There is no common name for the roughly 250 species placed here; new species are still being described regularly. Although the genus was proposed early in the 19th century, many of these moths were for a long time retained in Scoparia, the type genus of the subfamily and a close relative of Eudonia. A few small genera have been proposed for separation from Eudonia, but given the size of this group this is not particularly convincing; thus, all are retained here pending a comprehensive phylogenetic review.

Description and ecology
They are usually greyish-brownish and rather inconspicuous moths, though some are more boldly patterned in blackish, pale and even yellow hues. Like their close relatives, they lack the loop formed by forewing veins 1a/1b, and their labial palps are elongated and project straightly, appearing like a pointed "beak". The genitals have a characteristically simple shape in this genus; while they cannot usually be depended upon to differ significantly between species, they allow to distinguish this genus from similar moths. In the males, the clasper's harpe has few if any unusual features, the aedeagus is usually a rather nondescript rod, and the vesica bears a characteristic small disc with a grainy surface. In females, the ductus bursae is kinked at the junction of the forward (membranous) and hind (sclerotized) parts, with a particularly heavy sclerotized triangle bearing small teeth half-hidden in the kink.

They are common across the world's continents except in deserts, on high mountains, and in glaciated areas. They are apparently able to disperse well over water, as evidenced by the Polynesian radiations which occur mainly from Hawaiian Islands to the Austral Islands as well as on New Zealand; several of these island endemics might nowadays be rare or extinct due to the disappearance of their food plants, but overall the genus is not yet very well studied. As far as is known, the caterpillar larvae of most Eudonia feed on mosses, namely of subclasses Bryidae and Dicranidae; some also eat lichen. In a few cases, other food plants have been recorded or suspected, such as Colobanthus pearlworts or woody asterids of genus Olearia (daisy-bushes).

Species

 Eudonia abrupta 
 Eudonia achlya 
 Eudonia actias 
 Eudonia aeolias 
 Eudonia aequalis 
 Eudonia albafascicula 
 Eudonia albertalis 
 Eudonia albilinea 
 Eudonia alopecias 
 Eudonia alpina  (including E. lugubralis)
 Eudonia alticola 
 Eudonia amphicypella 
 Eudonia angustea 
 Eudonia anthracias 
 Eudonia antimacha 
 Eudonia aphrodes 
 Eudonia apicifusca 
 Eudonia aplysia 
 Eudonia ara 
 Eudonia asaleuta 
 Eudonia aspidota 
 Eudonia asterisca 
 Eudonia atmogramma 
 Eudonia australialis 
 Eudonia axena 
 Eudonia balanopis 
 Eudonia bidentata 
 Eudonia bisinualis 
 Eudonia bronzalis 
 Eudonia bucolica 
 Eudonia camerounensis 
 Eudonia cataxesta 
 Eudonia cavata 
 Eudonia chalara 
 Eudonia characta 
 Eudonia chlamydota 
 Eudonia choristis 
 Eudonia chrysomicta 
 Eudonia chrysopetra 
 Eudonia citrocosma 
 Eudonia clavula 
 Eudonia cleodoralis 
 Eudonia clerica 
 Eudonia clonodes 
 Eudonia colpota 
 Eudonia commortalis 
 Eudonia crassiuscula 
 Eudonia crataea 
 Eudonia critica 
 Eudonia cryerodes 
 Eudonia crypsinoa 
 Eudonia cymatias 
 Eudonia cyptastis 
 Eudonia dactyliopa 
 Eudonia decorella 
 Eudonia deltophora 
 Eudonia delunella 
 Eudonia demodes 
 Eudonia dinodes 
 Eudonia diphtheralis 
 Eudonia dochmia 
 Eudonia duospinata 
 Eudonia dupla 
 Eudonia echo 
 Eudonia empeda 
 Eudonia entabeniensis 
 Eudonia epicremna 
 Eudonia epicryma 
 Eudonia epimystis 
 Eudonia erebochalca 
 Eudonia eremitis 
 Eudonia excursalis 
 Eudonia exilis 
 Eudonia expallidalis 
 Eudonia exterminata 
 Eudonia extincta 
 Eudonia feredayi 
 Eudonia fogoalis 
 Eudonia formosa 
 Eudonia fotounii 
 Eudonia franciscalis 
 Eudonia franclemonti 
 Eudonia frigida 
 Eudonia furva 
 Eudonia geminoflexuosa 
 Eudonia geraea 
 Eudonia gigantea 
 Eudonia gonodecta 
 Eudonia gracilineata 
 Eudonia gressitti 
 Eudonia griveaudi 
 Eudonia gyrotoma 
 Eudonia halirrhoa 
 Eudonia hawaiiensis 
 Eudonia hemicycla 
 Eudonia hemiplaca 
 Eudonia heterosalis 
 Eudonia hexamera 
 Eudonia homala 
 Eudonia ianthes 
 Eudonia idiogama 
 Eudonia inexoptata 
 Eudonia inouei 
 Eudonia interlinealis 
 Eudonia ischnias 
 Eudonia isophaea 
 Eudonia ivelonensis 
 Eudonia jucunda 
 Eudonia lacustrata 
 Eudonia laetella 
 Eudonia legnota 
 Eudonia leptalea 
 Eudonia leucogramma 
 Eudonia leucophthalma 
 Eudonia liebmanni 
 Eudonia lijiangensis 
 Eudonia lindbergalis 
 Eudonia linealis 
 Eudonia lineola 
 Eudonia locularis 
 Eudonia loxocentra 
 Eudonia luminatrix 
 Eudonia luteusalis 
 Eudonia lycopodiae 
 Eudonia madagascariensis 
 Eudonia magna 
 Eudonia magnibursa 
 Eudonia malawiensis 
 Eudonia malgassicella 
 Eudonia manganeutis 
 Eudonia marioni 
 Eudonia marmarias 
 Eudonia mawsoni 
 Eudonia medinella 
 Eudonia melanaegis 
 Eudonia melanocephala 
 Eudonia melanographa 
 Eudonia melichlora 
 Eudonia meliturga 
 Eudonia mercurella 
 Eudonia meristis 
 Eudonia mesoleuca 
 Eudonia miantis 
 Eudonia microdontalis 
 Eudonia microphthalma 
 Eudonia minima 
 Eudonia minualis 
 Eudonia minusculalis 
 Eudonia montana 
 Eudonia munroei 
 Eudonia murana  – Scotch gray, wall grey
 Eudonia nakajimai 
 Eudonia nectarioides 
 Eudonia notozeucta 
 Eudonia nyctombra 
 Eudonia octophora 
 Eudonia oculata 
 Eudonia oenopis 
 Eudonia oertneri 
 Eudonia officialis 
 Eudonia okuensis 
 Eudonia ombrodes 
 Eudonia opostactis 
 Eudonia oreas 
 Eudonia organaea 
 Eudonia orthioplecta 
 Eudonia orthoria 
 Eudonia owadai 
 Eudonia oxythyma 
 Eudonia pachyerga 
 Eudonia pachysema 
 Eudonia paghmanella 
 Eudonia pallida 
 Eudonia paltomacha 
 Eudonia parachlora 
 Eudonia paraequalis 
 Eudonia parviangusta 
 Eudonia passalota 
 Eudonia pentaspila 
 Eudonia perierga 
 Eudonia perinetensis 
 Eudonia periphanes 
 Eudonia peronetis 
 Eudonia persimilis 
 Eudonia petrophila 
 Eudonia phaeoleuca 
 Eudonia philerga 
 Eudonia philetaera 
 Eudonia philorphna 
 Eudonia piroformis 
 Eudonia platyscia 
 Eudonia pongalis 
 Eudonia probolaea  (including E. omichlopis)
 Eudonia promiscua 
 Eudonia protorthra 
 Eudonia psammitis 
 Eudonia psednopa 
 Eudonia puellaris 
 Eudonia pygmina 
 Eudonia quaestoria 
 Eudonia rakaiensis 
 Eudonia rectilinea 
 Eudonia rectilineata 
 Eudonia religiosa 
 Eudonia rhombias 
 Eudonia rotundalis 
 Eudonia sabulosellus 
 Eudonia schwarzalis 
 Eudonia scoriella 
 Eudonia senecaensis 
 Eudonia shafferi 
 Eudonia siderina 
 Eudonia singulannulata 
 Eudonia sogai 
 Eudonia spaldingalis 
 Eudonia spectacularis 
 Eudonia speideli 
 Eudonia spenceri 
 Eudonia stenota 
 Eudonia steropaea 
 Eudonia strigalis 
 Eudonia struthias 
 Eudonia subditella 
 Eudonia submarginalis 
 Eudonia sudetica 
 Eudonia synapta 
 Eudonia taiwanalpina 
 Eudonia tetranesa 
 Eudonia thalamias 
 Eudonia thomealis 
 Eudonia threnodes 
 Eudonia thyellopis 
 Eudonia thyridias 
 Eudonia tibetalis 
 Eudonia tivira 
 Eudonia torniplagalis 
 Eudonia torodes 
 Eudonia triacma 
 Eudonia triclera 
 Eudonia trivirgatus 
 Eudonia truncicolella 
 Eudonia tyraula 
 Eudonia tyrophanta 
 Eudonia umbrosa 
 Eudonia ustiramis 
 Eudonia vallesialis 
 Eudonia venosa 
 Eudonia viettei 
 Eudonia vinasalis 
 Eudonia vivida 
 Eudonia wolongensis 
 Eudonia xysmatias 
 Eudonia yaoundeiensis 
 Eudonia ycarda 
 Eudonia zhongdianensis 
 Eudonia zophochlaena 
 Eudonia zophochlora

Footnotes

References
  (1986): Pyralidae and Microlepidoptera of the Marquesas Archipelago. Smithsonian Contributions to Zoology 416: 1-485. PDF fulltext  (214 MB!)
  (2010) Lepidoptera and Some Other Life Forms – Diaphania indica. Version of April 6, 2010. Retrieved October 14, 2011.
 , 1984: Contribution à l'étude des Scopariinae. 4. Révision des types décrits de la région paléarctique occidentale, description de dix nouveaux taxa et ébauche d'une liste des espèces de cette région. (Lepidoptera: Crambidae). Nouvelle Revue d'Entomologie Alexanor: 157-192.
 , 1985: Contribution à l'étude des Scopariinae. 5. Quatre nouveaux taxa d'Afghanistan. (Lepidoptera: Crambidae). Nouvelle Revue d'Entomologie N.S. 2 (3): 325-329.
 , 1986: Contribution à l'étude des Scopariinae. 6. Dix nouveaux taxa,  trois genres, de Chine et du nord de l'Inde. (Lepidoptera: Crambidae). Nouvelle Revue d'Entomologie N.S. 3 (1): 123-131.
 , 2012: One new species of the genus Eudonia Billberg (Lepidoptera: Crambidae: Scopariinae) from China. Entomotaxonomia 34 (2): 267-269.
 , 2012: Taxonomic revision of the genus Eudonia Billberg, 1820 from China (Lepidoptera: Crambidae: Scopariinae). Zootaxa 3273: 1-27.
 , 1998: The Scopariinae and Heliothelinae stat. rev. (Lepidoptera: Pyraloidea: Crambidae) of the Oriental Region-a revisional synopsis with descriptions of new species from the Philippines and Sumatra. Nachrichten des Entomologischen Vereins Apollo Supplement 17: 475-528.
 , 1998: Notes on the Scopariinae from Taiwan, with descriptions of nine new species (Lepidoptera: Crambidae). Tinea 15 (3): 191-201.

External links

Scopariinae
Crambidae genera
Taxa named by Gustaf Johan Billberg
Eudonia